Ahmed Shoukry Abdelraouf Aly Khalifa (born July 7, 1989) is an Egyptian footballer who plays as an attacking midfielder for Al Mokawloon Al Arab. He has been dubbed as the new Raúl for his technical skill, speed and left foot.

Career
Shoukry has made his debut with Al Ahly in 2009–10 Egyptian Premier League on 19 October 2009 Against Petrojet. Due to the absences of many stars like Mohamed Abo-Treika, Shoukry played in very important matches against Ismaily and Zamalek and he proved he is a great player and can fill in the role of Abo-Treika. Shoukry scored his first goal against Ittihad El-Shorta after coming on as a substitute to help Al Ahly win the game 4–2. Shoukry scored his second goal on the CAF Champions league 2010 in the second leg against Gunners in Cairo to help Al Ahly win the game 2–0. In July 2011, he moved to Telephonat Bani Sweif on a loan deal, scoring 4 goals in 15 games, in the uncompleted 2011–12 Egyptian League.

Shoukry started 2013 with Al Ahly as a substitute, but after the arrival of Mohamed Youssef the new coach Shoukry was put in the starting line up against Telephonat Beni Suef and scored his first goal this season with Al Ahly from a shot the match after Shoukry was in the starting line up against ENPPI and scored from a volley and played a match against Ghazl El Mahalla but couldn't score and had chance in the post.

Shoukry later played for Smouha, Al Masry, and ENPPI, before joining Al Mokawloon Al Arab in November 2020.

International career
Shoukry was a regular member of Egypt U-20 National team and participate in 2009 FIFA U-20 World Cup in Egypt scoring 2 goals in the tournament and against Italy U-20  leading Egypt to a 4–2 win. After arriving late to France to join the Under-23 squad in their preparations for the 2012 Toulon Tournament, Shoukry ended up being benched for the entire tournament. After returning from France, he insulted the coaching staff and head coach Hany Ramzy in public television. He criticized his techniques and accused him of being unfair. Ramzy later omitted him from the squad stating that Shoukry would never play in the 2012 Olympics.

References

External links
 
 Ahmed Shoukry at Footballdatabase

1989 births
Living people
Egyptian footballers
Association football midfielders
Al Ahly SC players
Smouha SC players
Al Masry SC players
ENPPI SC players
Al Mokawloon Al Arab SC players
2011 CAF U-23 Championship players
Egyptian Premier League players